Bytów is a PKP railway station in Bytów (Pomeranian Voivodeship), Poland.

Lines crossing the station

References 
Bytów article at Polish Stations Database, URL accessed at 29 March 2006

Railway stations in Pomeranian Voivodeship
Bytów County